This is a list of Canadian films which were released in 1991:

See also
 1991 in Canada
 1991 in Canadian television

External links
Feature Films Released In 1991 With Country of Origin Canada at IMDb

1991
1991 in Canadian cinema
Canada